The 2018 Valdosta State Blazers football team represented Valdosta State University as a member of the Gulf South Conference (GSC) during the 2018 NCAA Division II football season. They were led by third-year head coach Kerwin Bell, who also served as offensive coordinator. The Blazers played their home games at Bazemore–Hyder Stadium in Valdosta, Georgia. Valdosta State compiled an overall record of 14–0 with a conference mark of 8–0, winning the GSC title. They beat  in the NCAA Division II Championship Game to win the program's fourth national title.

Preseason

Gulf South Conference coaches poll
On August 2, 2018, the Gulf South Conference released their preseason coaches poll with the Blazers predicted to finish in fifth place in the conference.

Preseason All-Gulf South Conference Team
The Blazers had five players at five positions selected to the preseason all-Gulf South Conference team.

Offense

Kenny Benjamin – AP

Jeremy King – OG

Defense

Raymond Palmer – DB

Special teams

Jairus Jones – BT

Stewart Spence – UTL

Schedule
Valdosta State's 2018 regular season football schedule consisted of five home games, four away games, and one neutral site game. The Blazers hosted GSC foes Delta State, North Greenville, Shorter, and West Georgia, and traveled to Florida Tech, Mississippi College, West Alabama, and West Florida. Three games were broadcast on ESPN3, as part of the Gulf South Conference Game of the Week.

The Blazers hosted non-conference foe  from the Southern Intercollegiate Athletic Conference (SIAC) and competed in the Okefenokee Classic against , also from the (SIAC).

After an undefeated regular season, the Blazers were the No. 1 seed in the NCAA Division II playoffs.

Rankings

Game summaries

Albany State

Fort Valley State

at West Alabama

Shorter

at Mississippi College

Delta State

at Florida Tech

North Greenville

at West Florida

West Georgia

Bowie State

Lenoir-Rhyne

Notre Dame (OH)

Ferris State

Players drafted into the NFL

References

Valdosta State
Valdosta State Blazers football seasons
Gulf South Conference football champion seasons
NCAA Division II Football Champions
College football undefeated seasons
Valdosta State Blazers football